Tennessee Ridge is a town in Houston and Stewart counties in the U.S. state of Tennessee. The population was 1,332 at the 2020 census and 1,368 at the 2010 census.

The Stewart County portion of Tennessee Ridge is part of the Clarksville, TN–KY Metropolitan Statistical Area.

Geography
Tennessee Ridge is located at  (36.320797, -87.763012), at an elevation of 742 feet above sea level.

According to the United States Census Bureau, the town has a total area of 3.7 square miles (9.6 km2), of which 3.7 square miles (9.6 km2) is land and 0.27% is water.

Major roads and highways
 
  (Main Street)

ZIP code
The ZIP code used in the Tennessee Ridge area is 37178.

Area code
Tennessee Ridge uses the area code 931.

Government
 Board of Commissioners, Mayor & Vice Mayor meets the first Monday of the month at 6:00 p.m. at Tennessee Ridge Elementary School.

Elected officials
 City Mayor:  Stony Odom
 Vice Mayor: Ray Bradley
 City Manager: Kenneth Dunavant
 City Recorder: Leslie Rucker
 Town Treasurer: Nancy Cobb
 Commissioners: Tim Alsobrooks, Ray Bradley, and Rebecca Hill

Public safety and utilities
 Fire Chief: Trent Hearndon
 Public Works Director & Water Supt.: Jerry Bryant
 Utility Accounts: Leslie Rucker

Demographics

2020 census

As of the 2020 United States census, there were 1,332 people, 501 households, and 306 families residing in the town.

2000 census
As of the census of 2000, there were 1,334 people, 533 households, and 412 families residing in the town. The racial makeup of the town was 98.80% White, 0.22% African American, 0.15% Asian, 0.30% Pacific Islander, 0.37% from other races, and 0.15% from two or more races. Hispanic or Latino of any race were 1.05% of the population.

There were 533 households, out of which 29.1% had children under the age of 18 living with them, 62.5% were married couples living together, 10.3% had a female householder with no husband present, and 22.7% were non-families. 20.1% of all households were made up of individuals, and 9.6% had someone living alone who was 65 years of age or older. The average household size was 2.48 and the average family size was 2.82.

In the town, the population was spread out, with 23.1% under the age of 18, 6.3% from 18 to 24, 25.9% from 25 to 44, 26.0% from 45 to 64, and 18.7% who were 65 years of age or older. The median age was 41 years. For every 100 females, there were 95.3 males. For every 100 females age 18 and over, there were 92.1 males.

The median income for a household in the town was $33,029, and the median income for a family was $35,880. Males had a median income of $28,833 versus $24,659 for females. The per capita income for the town was $14,460. About 8.2% of families and 11.7% of the population were below the poverty line, including 13.5% of those under age 18 and 7.7% of those age 65 or over.

Schools

Public primary/middle schools
 Tennessee Ridge Elementary School - (Students: 456; Location: 135 School Street; Grades: KG - 05)

References

Towns in Houston County, Tennessee
Towns in Stewart County, Tennessee
Towns in Tennessee
Clarksville metropolitan area